John Poulett, 2nd Earl Poulett (10 December 1708 – 5 November 1764), styled Viscount Hinton until 1743 was an English peer.

Poulett was the son of John Poulett, 1st Earl Poulett and his wife, Bridget Bertie, daughter of the Honourable Peregrine Bertie, and was educated at Taunton Grammar School. In 1734, he was summoned to Parliament in his father's barony of Poulett by writ of acceleration and was a Lord of the Bedchamber until 1755. He inherited his father's earldom in 1743, was appointed Lord Lieutenant of Somerset in 1744, Colonel of the 1st Somerset Militia from 1759 and was sometime Recorder of Bridgwater.

Poulett died unmarried and childless in 1764 and his titles passed to his brother, Vere.

References

|-

|-

Lord-Lieutenants of Somerset
People educated at Taunton Grammar School
Somerset Militia officers
1708 births
1764 deaths
2
Burials at the Poulett mausoleum, Church of St George (Hinton St George)
John, 2nd Earl